Alphabet Energy was a startup company founded in 2009 at the University of California, Berkeley by thermoelectrics expert Matthew L. Scullin and Peidong Yang. The company uses nanotechnology and materials science applications to create thermoelectric generators that are more cost effective than previous bismuth telluride-based devices. The company is based in Hayward, California. It started with a license to use silicon nanowire developed at Lawrence Berkeley National Laboratory. They moved from UC Berkeley to offices in San Francisco in 2011, and later to Hayward.

Alphabet has a number of patents related to the capture of waste heat for purposes of electricity generation. The company is working with tetrahedrite, a common mineral with thermoelectric properties.

2011's The Lean Startup: How Today's Entrepreneurs Use Continuous Innovation to Create Radically Successful Businesses describes Alphabet Energy's approach to product development as an example of the successful practice of the book's principles. Author Eric Ries is on Alphabet's advisory board.

Alphabet has raised over $35 million in venture capital funding from Claremont Creek, TPG Capital, Encana and the California Clean Energy Fund. They were chosen as a 2014 World Economic Forum Technology Pioneer  and as a 2015 IHS CERAWeek Energy Innovation Pioneer.

Alphabet Energy ceased operation on 2018 Aug. 1st.

The company’s name, based on the word alpha, comes from its use as a term for a Seebeck coefficient, and has no relation to the Google holding company, Alphabet Inc.

Products

In 2014, Alphabet Energy introduced the world’s first industrial-scale thermoelectric generator, the E1.  The E1 takes exhaust heat from large industrial engines and turns it into electricity. The result is an engine that needs less fuel to deliver the same power.  The E1 is optimized for engines up to 1,400 kW, and works on any engine or exhaust source, currently generating up to 25 kWe on a standard 1,000 kW engine.  The E1's modules are interchangeable but currently come with a low-cost proprietary thermoelectric material and the device is rated for a 10-year life span.  As advances in thermoelectric materials are made, new modules can be swapped in for old ones, to continually improve fuel efficiency to as much as 10%.

High temperature heat-to-electricity conversion
In 2017 Alphabet Energy, with a $2-million grant from the California Energy Commission (CEC), has been partnering with Berkeley Lab "to create a cost-effective thermoelectric waste heat recovery system to reduce both energy use in the industrial sector and electricity-related carbon emissions." The goal is a prototype with 10+ percent efficiency, operating temperatures beyond the 400 degree Celsius limit up to 800 degrees, possible remote electricity generation for areas off the grid, and "modularization for a broad scale of..applications" unique at various locations.

References

External links
Company website
Company video at YouTube (posted by company)
E1 Thermoelectric Generator video at YouTube (posted by company)
IHS Energy CERAWeek interview with CEO, Dr. Matthew L. Scullin video at YouTube (posted by company)
PowerModule video at YouTube (posted by company)
Fortune article: A startup is finally bringing heat-to-power tech in a big way for vehicles (posted by company)

Nanotechnology companies
Companies based in Hayward, California
Technology companies established in 2009
2009 establishments in California
Technology companies based in the San Francisco Bay Area
Electric power in the United States
Thermoelectricity
University of California, Berkeley
Defunct technology companies of the United States
Technology companies disestablished in 2018
2018 disestablishments in California